Ramon "Bong" Osorio (November 5, 1953 – April 30, 2020) was a Filipino media executive and communication professor at the University of Santo Tomas Faculty of Arts and Letters. He served as Vice President of ABS-CBN for Corporate Communications. Osorio was President of the Public Relations Society of the Philippines and Council Member of the National Council for Children’s Television.

Early years and education
Osorio finished his basic education from Paco Catholic School and pursued a communication degree from University of Santo Tomas Faculty of Arts and Letters graduating in 1974. Osorio was a student leader, being a member of his faculty's newspaper The Flame and the university student publication The Varsitarian. Osorio is also the founding president of the Communication Arts Students' Association.

He attained his Master of Business Administration from Ateneo de Manila University and attended trainings at Johns Hopkins University and George Washington University.

Career
Osorio taught at the University of Santo Tomas and was promoted as the inaugural chairperson of the university's Department of Communication. He held the position for 17 years. While teaching in university, he practiced public relations and marketing for several media firms such as J. Walter Thompson, Saatchi & Saatchi, and DYR Alcantara. He worked as head of corporate communications of ABS-CBN as vice president from 2007 until his retirement in 2013. He continued writing for dailies in the Philippines such as The Philippine Star and BusinessMirror. He is a recipient of the prestigious TOTAL (The Outstanding Thomasian Alumni) Award from the University of Santo Tomas.

Health and death
Osorio was diagnosed with brain tumor in September 2019 and has undergone surgery in October 2019. He died on April 30, 2020. An online eulogy was produced by the University of Santo Tomas Communications Bureau and the program was hosted by Osorio's former student Jeffrey Espiritu.

References

University of Santo Tomas alumni
1953 births
2020 deaths
Academic staff of the University of Santo Tomas
Filipino media scholars